Providencia may refer to:

 Providencia, Chile, a commune in the Santiago Province
 Providencia District in Amazonas, Peru
 Providencia Island, part of the San Andrés y Providencia Department district of Colombia in the Caribbean sea
 Providencia, Nariño a town in municipality in southern Colombia
 Providencia (bacterium) a Gram-negative bacterial genus